Main River is a river in Newfoundland, Canada, a very popular canoeing destination. It is 57 km long, originates in the Long Range Mountains and enters the sea at White Bay.

Main River was designated a Canadian Heritage River in February 2001.

See also
List of rivers of Newfoundland and Labrador

References
 Canadian Heritage Rivers System
 Environment and Conservation Government of Newfoundland and Labrador official website

Rivers of Newfoundland and Labrador
Canadian Heritage Rivers